Parker Case is an American musician and drummer, mostly known from his involvement in the bands JamisonParker and Say Anything. Other than Max Bemis himself, Case was a part of Say Anything longer than any other member.

References

External links
I and the Universe Homepage
 http://www.billboard.com/articles/news/59517/billboard-bits-say-anything-gunther-erasure Parker Case—guitarist/keyboardist—joined Say Anything in 2006. Their tour began in New York City.

Living people
American pop musicians
Place of birth missing (living people)
1981 births
American rock drummers
Say Anything (band) members